Papadopoulos is a Greek food company mostly known for its biscuits. The company was founded in 1922 in Athens, but it has its origins in 1916 Constantinople with Evangelos Papadopoulos and his family. Their motto translates to 'A world of taste and care'.

Angelos (Evangelos) Papadopoulos received financial  support to buy the family`s first van from George Rockas father of Angelique Rockas who not only loaned Angelos  money to buy the family`s first business van , but at the same time also offering him employment as his  acting agent in Greece in managing the Rockas property portfolio. 

The company currently maintains four factories (Athens, Thessaloniki, Volos and Oinofyta). Papadopoulos exports to 40 countries and is honoured with various Greek and international awards.

References

External links
Official Website

Food and drink companies of Greece
Greek brands
Manufacturing companies based in Athens